The Bible In Basic English (also known as the BBE) is a translation of the Bible into Basic English.  The BBE was translated by Professor S. H. Hooke using the standard 850 Basic English words. 100 words that were helpful to understand poetry were added along with 50 "Bible" words for a total of 1,000 words. This version is effective in communicating the Bible to those with limited education or where English is a second language. The New Testament was released in 1941 and the Old Testament  was released in 1949.

The 1965 printing of the Bible was published by Cambridge Press in England without any copyright notice and distributed in the US, falling into the Public Domain according to the UCC convention of that time.

See also

Bible in Worldwide English
New International Reader's Version, a simplified English version of the New International Version

References

External links
Text of the BBE, searchable; the KJV and CUV are available for comparison
Bible Study Tools - Bible in Basic English 
BBE on StudyBible.info
BBE on Scripturefirst.net
PDF of 1965 printing of BBE
Bible in Basic English Collection at the John Rylands Library Manchester.
BBE license Information
BBE on Holy-Bible.online
 

1941 books
1949 books
English, Basic
1941 in Christianity